The  2010 Firestone 550 was the twenty-first running of the Firestone 550 and the seventh round of the 2010 IndyCar Series season. It took place on Saturday, June 5, 2010. The race was contested over 228 laps at the  Texas Motor Speedway in Fort Worth, Texas, and was telecasted by Versus in the United States.

The winner of the Firestone 550 was Ryan Briscoe, who was also the pole-sitter running a time of 1:37.3275.  Danica Patrick who led 1 lap finished in second with Marco Andretti finishing in third for the second consecutive week.


Classification

Qualifying

Race

Championship standings after the race

Drivers' Championship standings

 Note: Only the top five positions are included.

References

Firestone 550
Firestone 550
Firestone 550
Firestone 600